Deaf Hill is a village in County Durham, England. It is situated a short distance to the east of Trimdon Colliery. The origin of the name is not known. The alternative name for the village is Trimdon Station. 
Locally Deaf Hill is thought to have been originally called Death Hill, the name originating from a belief that if children were passed through the fork of a sycamore tree in the area they would be cured of diphtheria, however they died and the spot was called Death Hill. The name was changed as more people settled there.

According to Trimdon Snippets, "No one seems to know how this pit got its name of Deaf Hill, but the nearest guess is that in days of long ago, if land was very poor, the old farmers would say it was ‘deed’ or ‘dead’ land, which perhaps has grown into the word deaf" The rising land behind the pit is called Sleepy Hill.

References

Extract "how this pit got its name of Deaf Hill" from 'Trimdon Snippets' part of https://trimdon.com history section

Villages in County Durham
Trimdon